The Jeremiah Morrow Bridge is the name for a pair of concrete box girder bridges built between 2010 and 2016 which carry Interstate 71 over the Little Miami River gorge between Fort Ancient and Oregonia, Ohio. The bridges are named for former Governor of Ohio Jeremiah Morrow.

The bridges each have two marked lanes with room for a third lane.

The original Warren truss bridges at the same location were opened to traffic in 1965 and were continuous across five spans. Both of the original spans were replaced beginning in 2010, with the completion of construction work marked with an official ribbon cutting ceremony held on November 18, 2016.

The original bridges were approximately the same design and age as the I-35W Mississippi River bridge which collapsed in 2007. Demolition of the original southbound bridge was largely completed on April 23, 2017. The original northbound bridge had been demolished in 2014 after one of the new bridges was complete.

See also
 
 
 
 List of bridges in the United States by height

References

External links
ODOT photo of the 1965 bridges
Photos of the 1965 bridges from below

Buildings and structures in Warren County, Ohio
Bridges completed in 1964
Transportation in Warren County, Ohio
Road bridges in Ohio
Box girder bridges in the United States